Lingwood is a village and former civil parish,  east of Norwich, now in the parish of Lingwood and Burlingham, in the Broadland district, in the county of Norfolk, England. In 2011 the built-up area had a population of 2,719 and the built-up area sub division had a population of 2,493. In 1931 the parish had a population of 568.

Features 
Lingwood has a church called St Peter, a pub called the Kings Head on Station Road, a railway station on Station Road and a village hall. A parkrun takes place at the village hall every Saturday morning, at 9 am, and is run by local volunteers.

History 
The name "Lingwood" means 'Bank wood' or 'heather wood' On 1 April 1935 the parish was abolished and merged with Burlingham.

References

External links

 

Villages in Norfolk
Former civil parishes in Norfolk
Broadland